Marignac-Lasclares is a commune in the Haute-Garonne department in southwestern France.

Geography
The commune is bordered by four other communes: Gratens to the north, Le Fousseret to the west and southwest, Lafitte-Vigordane across the river Louge to the east, and finally by Saint-Élix-le-Château across the river Louge to the southeast.

The river Louge flows in the commune, forms a border between Lafitte-Vigordane and Saint-Élix-le-Château.

Population

See also
Communes of the Haute-Garonne department

References

Communes of Haute-Garonne